Vance Michael McAllister Sr. (born January 7, 1974), is an American businessman and Republican former member of the United States House of Representatives from Louisiana's 5th congressional district. He won a special runoff election held on November 16, 2013, for the seat vacated by fellow Republican Rodney Alexander. A year later, following a scandal involving infidelity, McAllister placed fourth, with 11.1 percent of the vote, in a competitive primary for a full term in the U.S. House.

U.S. House of Representatives

Tenure
In June 2014, the non-profit watchdog Citizens for Responsibility and Ethics in Washington requested that the Department of Justice and House Ethics Committee investigate a published statement from McAllister that an unnamed colleague had told him he would receive a $1,200 contribution from The Heritage Foundation for voting against a measure related to the Bureau of Land Management. McAllister responded that he had not received a donation, which he ascribed to the group being "upset" with him after revelations of his extramarital affair with a staffer. He also said that he had not cast the vote with the expectation of receiving money, but had revealed what was said to him to show how "money controls Washington" and how work in Congress is a "steady cycle of voting for fundraising and money instead of voting for what is right." A spokesman for The Heritage Foundation stated: "we would never do anything like that... we do not [make political donations]. The Heritage Foundation is a think tank and does research and education, but does not get involved with political bills at all."

Committee assignments
Committee on Agriculture
Committee on Natural Resources

Personal life

Extramarital encounter
On April 7, 2014, the Ouachita Citizen newspaper of West Monroe, posted online a copy of a surveillance video from an anonymous source which showed McAllister kissing a staff member in his Monroe district office.
The video was recorded in McAllister's Monroe congressional office on December 23, 2013. McAllister's aide Leah Gordon was alleged to have leaked the video to the Ouachita Citizen.  Both aides resigned in 2014. Melissa Anne Hixon Peacock was subsequently identified as a married, longtime employee of McAllister.

McAllister made a statement concerning the video: "There's no doubt I've fallen short and I'm asking for forgiveness. I'm asking for forgiveness from God, my wife, my kids, my staff, and my constituents who elected me to serve". Former opponent Republican State Senator Neil Riser said, "I think right now we should be mindful and sensitive to the families who are involved." McAllister's chief of staff, Adam Terry, said that the staff member was fired by the congressman.

The Hill, a Washington, D.C. newspaper, reported on April 9, 2014, that Louisiana Republican Party chairman Roger F. Villere Jr. called for McAllister to resign. One day later Louisiana Governor Bobby Jindal issued a similar demand, as did Hammond's Daily Star, a politically nonaligned newspaper editorially.

McAllister found himself being defended by Representative Cedric Richmond, the sole Democrat in Louisiana's U.S. House delegation. Richmond described McAllister's situation as one of the "gotcha moments" in which the political parties have "taken joy in the pain of their supposed opponents". U.S. Representative Bill Cassidy (R–Baton Rouge) urged respect for the McAllister family's privacy and cited the Golden Rule (Matthew 7:12).

2017 arrest warrant 

On September 27, 2017, a Louisiana judge issued a warrant for McAllister's arrest after he failed to appear for a debt hearing. McAllister had failed previously to appear for other debt hearings and it is claimed he owes $296,000 to one bank and $250,000 to another.

See also
List of federal political sex scandals in the United States

References

External links

 

1974 births
Living people
Businesspeople from Louisiana
People from Ouachita Parish, Louisiana
People from Oak Grove, Louisiana
Southern Baptists
United States Army soldiers
University of Louisiana at Monroe alumni
Republican Party members of the United States House of Representatives from Louisiana
21st-century American politicians
Baptists from Louisiana